Annerose Baier, married surname: Wetzel, (9 September 1946 — 9 March 2022) was a German ice dancer who represented East Germany. With her skating partner, Eberhard Rüger, she became a three-time Blue Swords champion (1963, 1965, 1966), the 1968 Prize of Moscow News champion, and an eight-time East German national champion (1962, 1964–1970). They finished in the top ten at eight ISU Championships. Their best continental result, fourth, came at the 1970 European Championships in Leningrad, Soviet Union. They finished as high as sixth at the World Championships, in 1969 (Colorado Springs, Colorado, United States) and 1970 (Ljubljana, Yugoslavia).

Baier/Rüger started their career at SC Wismut Karl-Marx-Stadt. In 1963, they began representing SC Karl-Marx-Stadt.

After retiring from competition, Baier coached skating in Karl-Marx-Stadt/Chemnitz.

Competitive highlights 
With Rüger

References 

1946 births
2022 deaths
German female ice dancers
Sportspeople from Chemnitz